"Don't Look Back into the Sun" is a song released by the Libertines as their fourth single. NME magazine awarded it single of the week upon its release. "Don't Look Back into the Sun" was released as a single only, therefore not appearing on any albums.

Release
The single was released in three versions in the United Kingdom featuring a re-recording of "Death on the Stairs" produced by Bernard Butler. With "Death on the Stairs" present the single was sometimes labeled as "Don't Look Back into the Sun"/"Death on the Stairs".

In various territories "Don't Look Back into the Sun" was released as an EP combining various UK B-sides on a single CD. It was also released as a seven track EP in Japan, featuring the music video for the song "I Get Along" as the eighth track.

"Don't Look Back into the Sun" was featured in the 2005 film The Long Weekend. and on the intro for episodes of the BBC sitcom Gavin & Stacey. The song was also used at the end of the first episode of The Inbetweeners, as well as being used for Kill Your Darlings ending credits, and the 2015 film Steve Jobs, during a sequence of news montages detailing the history of Steve Jobs and Apple Inc in the decade between Jobs’ launch of the NeXTcube and his eventual return to Apple in 1998.

In 2007 it was covered by The View on the BBC Radio 1 Established 1967 album, with the song representing the year 2003.

Reception
In May 2007, NME magazine placed "Don't Look Back into the Sun" at number five in its list of the 50 Greatest Indie Anthems Ever, one place ahead of the Libertines' "Time for Heroes". In October 2011, NME placed it at number 71 on its list "150 Best Tracks of the Past 15 Years".

Track listings
7-inch
 "Don't Look Back into the Sun" – 2:59
 "Death on the Stairs" – 3:43
 Re-recorded version

CD 1
 "Don't Look Back into the Sun" – 2:59
 "Death on the Stairs" – 3:43
 Re-recorded version
 "Tell the King" (Original Demo Version) – 3:44

CD 2
 "Don't Look Back into the Sun" – 2:59
 "Skint and Minted" (Demo) – 3:35
 "Mockingbird" – 3:14

Spanish EP
 "Don't Look Back into the Sun" – 2:59
 "Death on the Stairs" – 3:43
 Re-recorded version
 "Tell the King" (Original Demo Version) – 3:44
 "Skint and Minted" (Demo) – 3:35

Australian EP
 "Don't Look Back into the Sun" – 2:59
 "Death on the Stairs" – 3:43
 Re-recorded version
 "Tell the King" (Original Demo Version) – 3:44
 "Skint and Minted" (Demo) – 3:35
 "Mockingbird" – 3:14

Japanese EP
 "Don't Look Back into the Sun" – 2:59
 "Death on the Stairs" – 3:43
 Re-recorded version
 "Skint and Minted" (Demo) – 3:35
 "General Smuts" (Demo) – 3:31
 "Mr. Finnegan" (Demo) – 1:51
 "7 Deadly Sins" (Demo) – 2:50
 "Plan A" – 3:22
 I Get Along (Music Video)

Personnel

The Libertines

Carl Barât – guitar, vocals
Pete Doherty – vocals
John Hassall – bass
Gary Powell – drums

Additional personnel

Bernard Butler - guitar, production

Charts

Certifications

References

2003 singles
2003 songs
The Libertines songs
UK Independent Singles Chart number-one singles